The  Ovens & King Football Netball League is a minor country Australian rules football league based in North-Eastern Victoria in the vicinity of Wangaratta and more recently Benalla.

History
The Ovens & King Football League was formed on the 13th of June 1903, after a handful of men met at The Bulls Head Hotel in Wangaratta to consider forming a football competition. One week later, the first matches of the Ovens & King Football Association were played. The competition changed its name to the Ovens and King Football League after the 1928 season.

Today, more than 100 years later, teams from Benalla, Bright, Greta, King Valley, Milawa, Moyhu, North Wangaratta, Tarrawingee and Whorouly participate in seniors, reserves and five netball grades.

Located in the rich Ovens Valley and King Valley of northeast Victoria, the league has produced a number of elite football who have gone on to play in the AFL, including the cousins Nigel (Brisbane Lions) and Matthew Lappin (St Kilda/Carlton), ruckman Mark Porter (Kangaroos/Carlton) and most recently Michael Newton (Melbourne), Barry Hall St Kilda/Sydney/Western Bulldogs and Brendan Fevola Carlton and Brisbane Lions.

Community support is strong in the Ovens and King districts with crowds attending games usually greater than most neighbouring competitions. The local football is an important social outlet for many local communities and finals matches draw especially strong crowd numbers.

In 2010, the league added Tatong, Swanpool, Goorambat and Bonnie Doon, who had previously played in the now-defunct Benalla & District Football League. After four years of heavy losses, Swanpool and Tatong were thrown out of the competition by AFL County Victoria, ending nearly 100 years of tradition. A two-way merge proposed by the clubs was rejected, as was a transfer to the Picola District FL.

In 2019 Glenrowan were forced into recess following a player, coach and volunteer shortage.

Clubs

Former Clubs

Premiership history

Senior Football Premiers

1903 WANGARATTA RAINBOWS
1904 MOYHU
1905 WANGARATTA
1906 WANGARATTA
1907 ELDORADO
1908 ELDORADO
1909 MOYHU
1910 MOYHU
1911 MOYHU
1912 BEECHWORTH
1913 BEECHWORTH
1914 BEECHWORTH
1915-1918 play suspended
1919 ELDORADO
1920 WANGARATTA
1921 ELDORADO
1922 ELDORADO
1923 MILAWA
1924 MILAWA
1925 WHOROULY
1926 WHOROULY
1927 MILAWA
1928 ELDORADO
1929 MOYHU
1930 MOYHU
1931 WANGARATTA
1932 WANGARATTA
1933 MOYHU

1934 MOYHU
1935 WARATAHS
1936 MYRTLEFORD
1937 BEECHWORTH
1938 BEECHWORTH
1939 BEECHWORTH
1940 MILAWA
1941 WANGARATTA RAINBOWS
1942-1944 play suspended
1945 MYRTLEFORD
1946 GRETA
1947 MOYHU
1948 WANGARATTA ROVERS
1949 MYRTLEFORD
1950 BEECHWORTH
1951 BEECHWORTH
1952 WHOROULY
1953 TARRAWINGEE
1954 GRETA
1955 BOGONG
1956 BEECHWORTH
1957 CHILTERN
1958 CHILTERN
1959 MOYHU
1960 MOYHU
1961 BEECHWORTH
1962 MOYHU
1963 TARRAWINGEE
1964 TARRAWINGEE

1965 GRETA
1966 GRETA
1967 GRETA
1968 CHILTERN
1969 MILAWA
1970 KING VALLEY
1971 CHILTERN
1972 CHILTERN
1973 NORTH WANGARATTA
1974 BEECHWORTH
1975 TARRAWINGEE
1976 NORTH WANGARATTA
1977 WHOROULY
1978 WHOROULY
1979 BEECHWORTH
1980 GRETA
1981 KING VALLEY
1982 CHILTERN
1983 CHILTERN
1984 MILAWA
1985 MILAWA
1986 BRIGHT
1987 BRIGHT
1988 MOYHU
1989 WHOROULY
1990 TARRAWINGEE
1991 MILAWA
1992 BRIGHT

1993 GRETA
1994 CHILTERN
1995 GRETA
1996 CHILTERN
1997 NORTH WANGARATTA
1998 CHILTERN
1999 GRETA
2000 BEECHWORTH
2001 BEECHWORTH
2002 MOYHU
2003 MOYHU
2004 BRIGHT
2005 MOYHU
2006 MOYHU
2007 WHOROULY
2008 TARRAWINGEE
2009 MILAWA
2010 TARRAWINGEE
2011 MOYHU
2012 NORTH WANGARATTA
2013 MILAWA
2014 GLENROWAN
2015 GLENROWAN
2016 GLENROWAN
2017 GLENROWAN
2018 TARRAWINGEE
2019 MILAWA
2020-2021 play suspended
2022 BENALLA ALL BLACKS

Back-To-Back Premiers: Senior
 1905-1906: WANGARATTA
 1907-1908: ELDORADO
 1921-1922: ELDORADO
 1923-1924: MILAWA (Excluding the 1922 W.F.A. premiership) 
 1925-1926: WHOROULY
 1929-1930: MOYHU
 1931-1932: WANGARATTA
 1933-1934: MOYHU
 1950-1951: BEECHWORTH
 1957-1958: CHILTERN
 1959-1960: MOYHU
 1963-1964: TARRAWINGEE
 1971-1972: CHILTERN
 1977-1978: WHOROULY
 1982-1983: CHILTERN 
 1984-1985: MILLAWA
 1986-1987: BRIGHT
 2000-2001: BEECHWORTH
 2002-2003: MOYHU
 2005-2006: MOYHU

Three-peat Premiers: Senior
 1909-1910-1911: MOYHU
 1912-1913-1914: BEECHWORTH
 1937-1938-1939: BEECHWORTH
 1965-1966-1967: GRETA

Four-peat Premiers: Senior
 2014-2015-2016-2017: GLENROWAN

2009
Seniors: Milawa
Reserves: Tarrawingee
Thirds: Milawa
A Grade: Tarrawingee
B Grade: Tarrawingee
C Grade: Bright
U/17 Grade: Glenrowan

2008
Seniors: Tarrawingee
Reserves: Bright
Thirds: Milawa
A Grade: Milawa
B Grade: Tarrawingee
C Grade: North Wangaratta

2007
Seniors: Whorouly
Reserves: Whorouly
Thirds: Whorouly
A Grade: Moyhu
B Grade: Milawa
C Grade: Tarrawingee

2006
Seniors: Mohyu
Reserves: Whorouly
Thirds: Tarrawingee
A Grade: Mohyu
B Grade: Milawa
C Grade: Bright

Seasons

2007 Ladder
																	

FINALS

2008 Ladder
																	

FINALS																	
 																	

Note: Moyhu lost fifteen points in the First Semi-Final against Whorouly after a head count.

2009

2010

2011

2012

2013

2014

2015

2016

2017

2018

2019

2022

League Hall Of Fame
This pretigious honour for O&KFNL players & officials was first awarded in 2006.
2006: Ray Burns, Clyde Baker, Clem Goonan, Mick Nolan, Richie Shanley, Jim Skinns, Lionel Wallace.
2007: Ray Price, Vin Shelley, Ken Stewart.
2008: Fay Morgan, Fred Baker, Allan Dickson, Kevin Allen.
2009: Fred Jensen.
2010: Daryl Everitt, Neville Pollard, Laurie Stewart.
2011: Norm Bussell, Bob Comensoli, Kath Dobson, Max Newth.
2012: Brendan Allan, Mark Allan, Jeff Clarke.
2013: Ken Ellis, Gladys Townsend, Dawn Wallace, Rex Walter.
2014: Des Sheridan.
2015: Scott Douglas, Robyn Hogan, Wendy Hogan, Jock Lappin.
2016:
2017:
2018: Mal Dinsdale, Lionel Schutt, Kevin Rhodes, Gerard Nolan
2019:

League Life Members

Charlie H. Butler (Sec)      
               
G. Ray Barker (Pres)         
                         
Ron Marks (Tribunal)       
                        
John Keogh (Auditor)         
                        
Cyril C. Johnson (Tribunal)     
                        
Harold H. Wellington (Tribunal)       
                
Bert H.G. Harman (Reporter)    
                                                    
J R Mummery (Delegate)

William Smith (Sponsor etc.)          
                    
Clyde Baker (Sec)                            
                
Albert (Bert) A. Clarke (Pres)         
      
Jack M. Wood (Tribunal)

D.P. Jones (Auditor)

H. Peter Nolan (Pres)

Ken Stewart (Delegate)

Angry J.A. Ferguson (Auditor)

Fred Jensen (Delegate)

E.J (Ted) Lester (Delegate)

Fred Baker (Sec)

Vin Shelley (Pres)

D.R. (Toby) Schultz (Tribunal)

Les O`Keefe (Tribunal)

Bill Lowen (300 games) Bright

William. O`Brien (300 games) Greta

Rob Forrest (300 games) Beechworth

Rowdy Lappin (300 games) Chiltern

Rex Walter (300 games) North Wangaratta

Ross Nightingale (300 games) Bright

Gary Bussell (300 games) King Valley

Trevor Blair (300 games) Tarrawingee

Mark Allan (300 games) Milawa

Brendan Allan (300 games) Milawa

Lionel Schutt (300 games) Milawa, North Wang, Tarrawingee, Moyhu

Allan Dickson (League President)

Andrew Smith (300 games) Greta, Glenrowan

Mal Dinsdale (400 games) Tarrawingee

Geoff Robinson (400 games) Milawa

Russell Ferguson (400 games) Milawa

Steve Masin (300 games) Whorouly

Peter Hawkins (400 games) Moyhu

Bruce Nightingale (300 games)

Ab (Alan) Gillett (300 games) Bright

John Munari Moyhu

Patrick O'Shea (Bright)

Peter Jones (Bright)

Scott Douglas (Moyhu)

Robert Burrowes (Moyhu, King Valley)

Paul Hogan (Greta)

Senior Football Best and Fairest /  Clyde Baker Medal Winners

1932 Ron Black (Whorouly)

1933 Keith Parris (Beechworth)

1934 Arthur Mills (Waratahs)

1935 Ron Black (Whorouly)

1936 Jack Parrish (Eldorado)

1937 Maurie Valli (Milawa)

1938 Ron Reah (Moyhu)

1939 Ron Reah (Moyhu)

1940 ?

1941 Lionel Wallace (Moyhu)

1942 to 1944 World War II. O&KFL in recess

1945 ?

1946 Jock Gardner (Milawa)

1947 Jock Gardner (Milawa)

1948 Ian Thomas (King Valley)

1949 Jack Sullivan (Tarrawingee)

1950 A. `Mick` Jess (Whorouly)

...... Jack Sullivan (Tarrawingee)*

1951 Jock Gardner (Milawa)

1952 Doug Ferguson (Eldorado)

1953 Ray Warford (Moyhu)

1954 Tim Lowe (Beechworth)

1955 Ray Warford (Moyhu)

1956 Ray Warford (Moyhu), Tim Lowe (Beechworth), Greg Hogan (Moyhu)

1957 Bill Pinder (King Valley)

1958 Clem Goonan (Whorouly)

1959 K. Spink (Whorouly)

1960 Colin Barnes (Greta)

1961 Colin Barnes (Greta)

1962 Ken Dixon (Chiltern)

1963 Ron Critchley (Whorouly)

1964 Eddie Hooper (Greta)

1965 Rob Comensoli (Moyhu)

1966 Les Butler (Bright)

1967 Rob Comensoli (Moyhu)

1968 Bill McAuliffe (Whorouly) (1st CLYDE BAKER MEDAL)

1969 Alan McDonald (Moyhu)

1970 Stuart Elkington (Whorouly)

1971 Garry Holmes (King Valley)

1972 Mick Lloyd (Moyhu)

1973 Eddie Flynn (North Wangaratta)

1974 John Lappin (Chiltern)

1975 Rob Parolin (Whorouly)

1976 Vic Christou (King Valley)

1977 John Rutten (Beechworth)

1978 Neville Pollard (Milawa), John Lappin (Chiltern), Terry Wadley (Greta)

1979 Con Madden (Beechworth)

1980 Neville Pollard (Milawa)

1981 Richie Allen (King Valley)

1982 John Lappin (Chiltern)

1983 Neale McMonigle (North Wangaratta) & Neil Ferguson (Bright)

1984 Geoff Lacey (Greta) & Greg Taylor (Bright)

1985 Con Madden (Beechworth)

1986 Peter Duncan (Whorouly)

1987 Mark Ottery (Moyhu)

1988 Tony Gleeson (Greta)

1989 Peter Lappin (Chiltern)

1990 Tony Gleeson (Greta)

1991 Fred Pane (North Wangaratta)

1992 Laurie Larsen (Whorouly)

1993 Mark Johns (North Wangaratta)

1994 Mark Porter (King Valley)

1995 Paul Hogan (Greta)

1996 Tony Gayfer (Rutherglen)

1997 Des Smith (Moyhu)

1998 Colin McClounan (Whorouly)

1999 Rod Milthorpe (Rutherglen)

2000 Shane Driscoll (North Wangaratta)

2001 Scott Francis (Rutherglen) & Andy Mihaljevic (Beechworth)

2002 Adam Clarke (Tarrawingee) &  John Allen (Beechworth)

2003 Ty Baxter (Bright)

2004 Stuart Cooper (King Valley)

2005 Richard Bull (Milawa)

2006 Tom Hazell (Greta)

2007 Anthony Welsh (Moyhu)

2008 Mathew Kelly (Bright) & Finton Eames (Tarrawingee)

2009 Steve Nightingale (Bright)

2010 Steve Nightingale (Bright)

2011 Nathan Waite (Moyhu)

2012 Adam Williams (King Valley)

2013 Adam Williams (King Valley)

2014 Daniel Godsmark (Bonnie Doon)

2015 Ben Bond (Bright)

2016 Kaine Herbert (Bonnie Doon)

2017 Jeremy Wilson (Moyhu)

2018 Chris Dube (Greta)

2019 Jamie Allan (Milawa) & Nick Lebish (Bright)

2020 O&KFNL in recess > COVID-19

2021 S Cappitelli (Bonnie Doon)

2022 Riley Moran (Benalla All Blacks) 

 1950 - Jack Sullivan (Tarrawingee) has never been awarded a retropective best & fairest medal like others have.

Senior Leading Goal Kicking Winners

1903 Bob Condron (Rainbows)

1906 N.Pinkerton (Wangaratta)                      7 plus

1907 H.Walker (Eldorado)                          16 plus

1909 Laidler (Wangaratta)                         10 plus

1910 Cupples (Wangaratta)                         16 plus

1911 N.Pinkerton (Wangaratta)

1913 H.Hill (Moyhu)                               10 plus

1914 H.Hill (Moyhu)                               15 plus

1919 Ivo Atkinson (Wangaratta)

1920 Ivo Atkinson (Wangaratta)                    32 plus

1921 Flegg (Wangaratta)                           21 plus

1922 Andy “Andyfox” Ferguson (Milawa)

1923 Andy “Andyfox” Ferguson (Milawa)

1924 R. McNamara (Gapsted)                        24 plus

1925 A. (Andyfox) Ferguson (Milawa)               31 plus

1926 Ossie Carter (Whorouly)                      26

1928 A.(Andyfox) Ferguson (Milawa)                81

1929 Norm Wallace (Myrtleford)                    46 plus

1930 Eric Johnstone (Moyhu)                       35 plus

1931 Bert Carey (Wangaratta)                      85

1932 Bert Carey (Wangaratta)                      76

1933 Neville Justice (Myrtleford)                 58 plus

1934 Syd Wortmann (Whorouly)                      79 plus

1935 Ford Barton (Myrtleford)                     46 plus

1936 Norm Wallace (Myrtleford)                    70 plus

1937 Ford Barton (Myrtleford)                     37 plus

1938 Len Jordon (Eldorado)                        53 plus

1939 Sidney Londrigan (Beechworth)                41

1940 Jim Corker (Moyhu)                           30 plus

1941 Ernie Ward (Rainbows)                        59

1945 Jock Gardner (Milawa)                        35 plus

1946 Len Ablett (Myrtleford)                     108

1947 Jim Corker (Moyhu)                           47 plus

1948 A. “Wally” Cunneen (Myrtleford)              64 plus

1949 A. “Wally” Cunneen (Myrtleford)              52 plus

1950 ?

1951 Lex Nicholl (Whorouly)                       37 plus

1952 Doug Ferguson (Eldorado)                     75

1954 Gerald O’Neill (Chiltern)                    87

1955 John Farmer (Tarrawingee)                    86 plus

1956 Ron Howes (Chiltern)                        103

1957 Ron Howes (Chiltern)                         71

1959 Ivan Chant (Chiltern)                        54

1960 Ted McSweeney (Whorouly)                     62

1961 Ted McSweeney (Whorouly)                     71

1962 Maurie Hogan (Greta)                         96

1963 Maurie Hogan (Tarrawingee)                   78

1964 John Farmer (Tarrawingee)                    68

1965 Brian McDonald (Beechworth)                  63

1966 Bob Stone (Tarrawingee)                      73

1967 Bob Stone (Tarrawingee)                      57

1968 Bill Cassidy (Chiltern)                      76

1969 Bob McWaters (Beechworth)                   112

1970 Ray Hooper (King Valley)                    102

1971 Ray Hooper (King Valley)                    109

1972 Bob McWaters (Beechworth)                   111

1973 Graham Hill (Beechworth)                     92

1974 Graham Hill (Beechworth)                    115

1975 Graham Hill (Beechworth)                    110

1976 Dave Piggott (Whorouly)                      89

1977 Alan Sewell (Whorouly)                      126

1978 Alan Sewell (Whorouly)                      104

1979 Ron “Jock” Lappin (Chiltern)                 88

1980 Glenn Daws (King Valley)                     61

1981 Glenn Daws (King Valley)                     68 plus

1982 Steve Thompson (Bright)                     123

1983 Jim McNamara (Whorouly)                      88

1984 John Michelini (Milawa)                     114

1985 Graham Hill (Beechworth)                    110

1986 Mal Dinsdale (Tarrawingee)                   74

........ Vere Mounsey (Bright)                    74

1987 Mick Worthington (Whorouly)                 106

1988 John Iwanuch (Moyhu)                        113

1989 Tim Wallace (Beechworth)                     85 plus

1990 Chris Long (Tarrawingee)                    106

1991 Mark Higgs (Milawa)                          76

1992 Mark O’Connor (Milawa)                         71

1993 Peter Smith (Bright)                         81

1994 Damian Lord (Whorouly)                      107

1995 Alan Millard (Chiltern)                      84

1996 Ray Robbins (Rutherglen)                      81

1997 Peter Busch (Rutherglen)                    101

1998 Darren Bate (Beechworth)                    100

1999 Dale Andrews (Chiltern)                      93

2000 Darren Bate (Beechworth)                     79

2001 Darren Bate (Beechworth)                    117

2002 Darren Bate (Beechworth)                     97

2003 Shane Moore (Moyhu)                         103

2004 Shane Moore (Moyhu)                         108

2005 Shane Moore (Moyhu)                         132

2006 Shane Moore (Moyhu)                         103

2007 Shane Moore (Moyhu)                          81

2008 Brendan Sessions (Tarrawingee)              135

2009 Brendan Sessions (Tarrawingee)              116

2010 Daniel West (Whorouly)                       96

2011 Duane Haebich (Benalla All Blacks)          108

........ Daniel Lewis (Milawa)               108 & 9

........ Brendan Sessions (King Valley)      97 & 12

........ Jeremy Wilson Moyhu                 85 & 16

2012 Richard Leahy (Whorouly)                    147

2013 Brendan Sessions (King Valley)              105

2014 Hamish Moore (Tarrawingee)                  136

2015 Josh Evans (Bonnie Doon)                     92

2016 Kyle Raven (Tarrawingee)                    107

2017 Justin Hoggan (Tarrawingee)                 104

2018 James McClonan (Tarrawingee)                 94

2019 Tom Mullane Grant (Bright)                  113

2020 O&KFNL in recess > COVID-19

2021 Daniel Cassidy (Greta)                       56

2022 Lachlin Thompson (Benalla All Blacks)       109

2023

Notes

References

External links 
 Full Points Footy -Ovens & King Football League
O&KFNL Official Website

Australian rules football competitions in Victoria (Australia)
1903 establishments in Australia